The Mirpur Division is a first-order administrative division of the Pakistani dependent territory of Azad Kashmir.  Mirpur is the largest division by population in Azad Kashmir. It comprises the portion of the former Mirpur District of the princely state of Jammu and Kashmir that came under Pakistani control at the end of the Indo-Pakistani War of 1947.

History
The area of the present Mirpur Division was a part of the former princely state of Jammu and Kashmir during the British Raj and after the partition of India.  After the Indo-Pakistani War of 1947, it became part of what is now Azad Kashmir.  The Mirpur Division was the location of the Mirpur Massacre in November 1947.

Districts
Currently, the Mirpur Division consists of the following districts:

 Bhimber District
 Kotli District
 Mirpur District

References
 

Azad Kashmir
Divisions of Pakistan